Bobbed Hair may refer to:

 Bobbed Hair (1922 film), a 1922 American romance film
 Bobbed Hair (1925 film), a 1925 silent comedy film
 Bobbed Hair (1967 film), a 1967 South Korean film
 Bobbed hair, a hair style